Louie McCarthy-Scarsbrook (born 14 January 1986) is a professional rugby league footballer who plays as a  or  for St Helens in the Betfred Super League. He has played for both England and Ireland at international level.

He came through the London Broncos academy, but only played for the first team when it was named Harlequins RL in the Super League.

LMS is contracted to play for St. Helens until 2020, which will be his testimonial season. In close to ten years he has won three League Leader's Shields in 2014, 2018 and 2019 plus the 2014 Super League Grand Final, 2019 Super League Grand Final and the 2020 Super League Grand Final.  He has made one Challenge Cup Final appearance.

Background
Louie McCarthy-Scarsbrook was born 14 January 1986 in Whitechapel, London, England.

Grew up on the Isle of Dogs.

Playing career

Early career
McCarthy-Scarsbrook was a product of the Quins RL Junior Academy squad. He toured Australia with British Amateur Rugby League Association U18s in 2004. He spent the 2005 season on loan at Hull FC's Senior Academy, and played a prominent role in Hull's reserve grade Grand Final winning season.

Harlequins RL
McCarthy-Scarsbrook returned to London and in 2006 made his Super League début. By 2008 Harlequins coach Brian McDermott was tipping McCarthy-Scarsbrook for a place in England's World Cup squad.

McCarthy-Scarsbrook was named in the England training squad for the 2008 Rugby League World Cup.

McCarthy-Scarsbrook was named in the England team to face Wales at the Keepmoat Stadium, Doncaster prior to England's departure for the 2008 Rugby League World Cup.

McCarthy-Scarsbrook made his England début in the victory over Wales on 10 October 2008.

McCarthy-Scarsbrook's second game for England was also against Wales, a 48-12 victory in the 2009 Four Nations tournament in which he scored a try.

McCarthy-Scarsbrook announced on 1 September 2010 that he was to leave Quins at the end of the season after turning down a new contract.

St Helens
On 3 September 2010, St Helens confirmed the capture of Louie McCarthy-Scarsbrook on a four-year deal starting in 2011, where he'll join up with St. Helens' other new signings Josh Perry and Michael Shenton. Upon Signing the deal Louie said, '"St Helens are entering an exciting time in their history and to be a part of that was a great pull."
He continued: "Not only will they have a new stadium in 2012 but the quality of the players already in the squad means they will be challenging on all fronts.
"I am looking forward to linking up with my new teammates and continuing to learn under Royce Simmons.
"I would like to thank Quins for giving me the chance to play rugby league and I have enjoyed my time there. The fans and players have been excellent with me and I wish them all well in the future."

He played in the 2011 Super League Grand Final defeat by the Leeds Rhinos at Old Trafford.

In 2014, McCarthy-Scarsbrook made his 100th appearance for St Helens in their Challenge Cup fixture against Leeds.

He played in the 2019 Challenge Cup Final defeat by the Warrington Wolves at Wembley Stadium.

He played in the 2019 Super League Grand Final victory over the Salford Red Devils at Old Trafford.

He played in St Helens 2020 Super League Grand Final victory over Wigan at the Kingston Communications Stadium in Hull.

He played for St. Helens in their 2021 Challenge Cup Final victory over Castleford.
On 9 October 2021, he played for St. Helens in their 2021 Super League Grand Final victory over Catalans Dragons.
In round 23 of the 2022 Super League season, McCarthy-Scarsbrook scored a rare double in St Helens 60-6 victory over Hull F.C.
On 24 September 2022, McCarthy-Scarsbrook played off the interchange bench in St Helens 24-12 victory over Leeds in the 2022 Super League Grand Final.
On 18 February 2023, McCarthy-Scarsbrook played in St Helens 13-12 upset victory over Penrith in the 2023 World Club Challenge.

International
A former England international, for the 2017 Rugby League World Cup he was named in the Ireland squad.

References

External links
St Helens profile
(archived by web.archive.org) Quins RL profile
Louie McCarthy-Scarsbrook, Harlequins
Quins targeting top six
SL profile
Statistics at rlwc2017.com
Saints Heritage Society profile

1986 births
Living people
English people of Irish descent
English rugby league players
England national rugby league team players
Ireland national rugby league team players
London Broncos players
People from Lewisham
Rugby league players from London
Rugby league props
Rugby league locks
St Helens R.F.C. players